"The Diary of Jane" is a song by American rock band Breaking Benjamin. It was released in June 2006 as the lead single from their third album, Phobia. The song, one of their most notable and successful, is the fastest-added single ever in the history of Hollywood Records. It gained a massive amount of radio play throughout the United States and reached number one under three rock charts. The single was certified 4× Platinum in the United States on February 3, 2021 and Silver in the United Kingdom on July 17, 2020, making it their most successful single in terms of sales internationally.

Inspiration

In 2019, singer Ben Burnley said:

Background
The single moved rapidly up the charts in its first week of official release. It debuted on the Billboard Hot 100 at number 55 before reaching number 50 and spending 15 weeks on chart. It was the number one most-added track at three formats: Rock, Modern Rock and Active Rock. This success propelled the song to number two on the Mainstream Rock Tracks chart and number four on the Modern Rock Tracks chart. "The Diary of Jane", as of June 2006, could be heard on over 100 radio stations in America. "The Diary of Jane" was the fastest added single in Hollywood Records history, topping such artists as Queen. The success of the song led it to be featured in the video game NASCAR 07 and as downloadable content for Rock Band and Rock Band 2. The song was also featured in the 2008 dance film Step Up 2: The Streets.

Alternative versions
In total, the song has three different versions: the original version, the album version and the acoustic version, with the original being the only one that is not featured on Phobia. The original version was released with the single and was the track used for the video and radio airplay. It maintains almost no difference from the album version, with an exception of the ending fading out on a lower note along with other minor differences.

The album version is included on Phobia as the second track, it features the usual Breaking Benjamin sound of heavy percussion, down-tuned guitars, and the powering vocals of Benjamin Burnley, as well as the use of death growl vocals during two vocal passages. It is essentially a re-recording of the original. The song overall is notable for featuring a musical style closer to nu metal, as opposed to the band's overall alternative metal sound.

The acoustic version is featured as a bonus track on the first pressing of Phobia. It features softer vocals by Burnley and harmonized softly by Sebastian Davin (of Dropping Daylight) as well as a shift of instruments: from drums, bass and guitar to piano (played by Burnley). Orchestral string instruments such as a violin and cello are also used.

Music video

The video for "The Diary of Jane", directed by Ryan Smith, made its world premiere on Yahoo! Music on June 21, 2006, after originally being scheduled for release on June 16. The video features a woman named Jane Bryan, played by Sarah Mather from season four of American Idol. Jane wakes up suddenly in a bathtub, getting out and getting dressed. However, her vanity mirror is gone, and only the frame remains. Jane runs around her house, with similar results wherever there should be a mirror. It also shows scenes of the band playing in a room filled with mirrors. She eventually stumbles across the same room where all the mirrors are, and she cannot see her reflection in any of them. The video ends as Benjamin Burnley (the band's frontman) places a rose in a book atop her tombstone, explaining the story of the video: she fell asleep and drowned in the bathtub.

At the end of the video where Burnley closes the diary on Jane's tombstone, the last name was obscured. However, in the second episode of the band's podcast, the name can be clearly seen as "Bryan" during a shot of the tombstone. A Breaking Benjamin Celtic knot can also be seen on the tombstone in a brief shot before he closes the diary.

Jane Bryan was a female film star in the 1930s and 1940s. She was in many films, including We Are Not Alone, which is also the title for Breaking Benjamin's second album.

As of December 2021, the music video on YouTube has over 200 million views, making it the band's most viewed video on the site.

Track listing

Personnel
Breaking Benjamin
 Benjamin Burnley – lead vocals, rhythm guitar
 Aaron Fink – lead guitar
 Mark Klepaski – bass
 Chad Szeliga – drums
Production
Produced by David Bendeth
Mixed by Chris Lord-Alge
Music video directed by Ryan Smith

Charts

Certifications

References

 

Breaking Benjamin songs
2006 singles
2006 songs
Hollywood Records singles
Songs written by Aaron Fincke
Songs written by Benjamin Burnley